The Ketchum Ranger District Administrative Site is a historic site at 131/171 River St. in Ketchum, Idaho.  Significance of the site dates to 1929.  It has also been known as Ketchum Ranger Station and as the Heritage and Ski Museum.

It is a compound that served as District Office for the ranger serving the Sawtooth National Forest during 1929 to 1965.  After 1965 it served as a work station and residence for Forest Service staff, including fire fighters.  According to a Historic American Buildings Survey profile, "The compound is typical of Forest Service compounds constructed during the Depression Era, and retains much of its original character.

It was designed by George L. Nichols and built by Civilian Conservation Corps (CCC) labor. Its architecture is "Forest Service Standard Plan".

See also 

Ketchum Sun Valley Historical Society Heritage & Ski Museum

References 

Park buildings and structures on the National Register of Historic Places in Idaho
Government buildings completed in 1929
Buildings and structures in Blaine County, Idaho
History museums in Idaho
Historic districts on the National Register of Historic Places in Idaho
National Register of Historic Places in Blaine County, Idaho